Alpine Linux is a Linux distribution designed to be small, simple and secure. Alpine Linux uses musl, BusyBox and OpenRC instead of the more commonly used glibc, GNU Core Utilities and systemd respectively. 

For security, Alpine compiles all user-space binaries as position-independent executables with stack-smashing protection.

Because of its small size and rapid startup, it is commonly used in containers providing quick boot-up times, on virtual machines as well as on real hardware in embedded devices, such as routers, servers and NAS.

History
Originally, Alpine Linux began as a fork of the LEAF Project.  The members of LEAF wanted to continue making a Linux distribution that could fit on a single floppy disk, whereas the Alpine Linux wished to include some more heavyweight packages: Squid and Samba. They also added security features and a newer kernel.

Alpine's package management system, apk-tools, was originally a collection of shell scripts but was later rewritten in C.

As of 04 June 2014, Alpine Linux switched from uClibc to musl as its C standard library

A hardened kernel was included in the default distribution for up to and including Alpine 3.7, which aided in reducing the impact of exploits and vulnerabilities.

Features

Alpine Linux can be installed as a run-from-RAM operating system. The LBU (Alpine Local Backup) tool optionally allows all configuration files to be backed up to an APK overlay file (usually shortened to apkovl), a tar.gz file that by default stores a copy of all changed files in /etc (with the option to add more directories). This allows Alpine to work reliably in demanding embedded environments or to (temporarily) survive partial disk failures as sometimes experienced in public cloud environments.

By default, Alpine includes patches that allow using efficient meshed VPNs using the DMVPN standard.

Alpine has reliably had excellent support of Xen hypervisors in up-to-date versions, which avoids issues as experienced with Enterprise Distributions. (The standard Linux hypervisor KVM, is also available.)

Alpine Configuration Framework (ACF): While optional, ACF is an application for configuring an Alpine Linux machine, with goals similar to Debian's debconf. It is a standard framework based on simple Lua scripts.

Derivatives 
postmarketOS, a Linux distribution for mobile devices, is based on Alpine Linux.

References

External links
 

Independent Linux distributions
Light-weight Linux distributions
Linux distributions
Linux distributions without systemd
X86-64 Linux distributions